Alejandro Vidal (born 1897, date of death unknown) was a Chilean cyclist. He competed in two events at the 1924 Summer Olympics and one event at the 1928 Summer Olympics.

References

External links
 

1897 births
Year of death missing
Chilean male cyclists
Olympic cyclists of Chile
Cyclists at the 1924 Summer Olympics
Cyclists at the 1928 Summer Olympics
Place of birth missing